"Long, Long Time" is a song written by Gary White. The song was a hit for Linda Ronstadt, whose rendition of it was included on her 1970 album Silk Purse. The song is about a lasting love for someone who never became a lover.

Linda Ronstadt version
In 1970, Linda Ronstadt released the song as a single and on the album Silk Purse. The single spent 12 weeks on the Billboard Hot 100 chart, peaking at No. 25, while reaching No. 15 on Canada's "RPM 100" (her first single there), No. 8 on Canada's CHUM 30 chart, and No. 20 on Billboards Easy Listening chart.

In 1971, Linda Ronstadt was nominated for a Grammy Award for Best Contemporary Female Vocal Performance for her rendition of "Long, Long Time".

Chart performance

Other versions
In 1971, American singer Rod McKuen included the song on his album Pastorale.
In 1973, Harry Belafonte sang a cover on his album Play Me in a duet with Eloise Laws.
In 1976, Larry Santos released a cover of the song, which reached No. 38 on Billboards Easy Listening chart and No. 109 on Billboards "Bubbling Under the Hot 100".
Lynn Anderson recorded it on her 1976 album All The King's Horses.
In 1989, Jerry Jeff Walker covered this song, on his album Live at Gruene Hall.
In 1997, American country music singer Mindy McCready included the song on her album If I Don't Stay the Night.
In 1998, Canadian singer/songwriter Alannah Myles covered the song for her compilation album The Very Best Of Alannah Myles.

In popular culture

The song appeared in a 1975 episode of The Rockford Files, season 1, episode 23, "Roundabout". As Rockford is looking for a lounge singer, Nancy Wade, he finds her at the piano singing "Long, Long Time" as part of her musical set. The Nancy Wade character was played by actress Jesse Welles. The episode aired on March 7, 1975.
The song appears in the 2018 movie Hot Summer Nights.
The song is played during the third episode (which shares the name with the song) of the television series The Last of Us, serving as a motif for the relationship between characters Bill and Frank. After the episode was broadcast, Spotify announced that streams of the song increased by 4,900% over the previous week; several outlets compared it to the 2022 resurgence of Kate Bush's "Running Up That Hill" after its use in the fourth season of Stranger Things. In the period after the episode was broadcast, the song topped three separate Billboard charts, more than 50 years after its release, placing at No. 1 on the Rock Digital Song Sales, LyricFind U.S. and LyricFind Global rankings dated February 11, 2023.

References

External links
 Lyrics of this song
 

1970 songs
1970 singles
Capitol Records singles
Casablanca Records singles
Linda Ronstadt songs
Larry Santos songs
Song recordings produced by Elliot Mazer
Torch songs